Geoffrey Baer is an American television personality, actor and producer best known for hosting the 10 That Changed America series, the Chicago By Boat architecture series, and other television programs produced by WTTW in Chicago for Illinois PBS stations. His programs offer an enhanced understanding of the history, culture, and people of the Chicago area as well as American architecture.

Early life
Born in 1960, Baer was raised in the Chicago suburbs of Highland Park and Deerfield.  Baer's father was an accountant while his mother worked as a music and art teacher.  His family is of Eastern European Jewish ancestry. Baer recalls one prophetic childhood moment in which his Russian/Yiddish grandmother, grasping his face in her hands, proclaimed that he would be on television someday.  Baer was involved in theater in high school, and he majored in radio, television and film at Miami University.

Career
After graduating from college, Baer worked at various television stations in Cincinnati, Saginaw, Michigan, and Philadelphia, eventually becoming a staff producer of a nightly television show in Philadelphia.  Returning to school at Northwestern University’s School of Communication, Baer earned a master's degree in theater, and then taught theater part-time for five years at a small, private high school called the Chicago Academy for the Arts.  He also became a volunteer docent for the Chicago Architecture Foundation and led boat tours of the Chicago River.

Work with WTTW

In 1989, Baer began working for WTTW Chicago as an associate producer for arts programs while continuing to lead Chicago Architecture Foundation boat tours on the weekends.  In 1995, the newly-appointed chairman of WTTW took one such tour and approached Baer afterward.  According to Baer, "By the time I got to work the next day, he’d called the station and said we should make the tour a TV show."
His first show, Chicago By Boat, became so popular that it was updated in 2006.  By then, Baer had hosted more than 20 programs highlighting Chicago area architecture and history.  Today, Baer's programs often accompany pledge drives for WTTW because pledges tend to increase during Baer's programs or when DVDs of his programs are offered as gifts in exchange for pledges.  Baer often serves as host and producer for these pledge shows.

Personal life
Baer lives in Evanston, Illinois; he has a wife and two daughters.  In his free time, he enjoys competitive sailing and rowing.

Filmography

References

External links 
 

Year of birth missing (living people)
Living people
American television personalities
American male film actors
American male television actors
Travel broadcasters